Peñausende is a municipality located in the province of Zamora, Castile and León, Spain.

See also 
 Arribes del Duero Natural Park
 Zamora city
 Zamora province

References

Municipalities of the Province of Zamora